Tracie C. Collins is an American academic, physician, and government official serving as the Secretary of Health of New Mexico. Prior to her confirmation by the New Mexico Senate on February 19, 2021, Collins was the dean of the University of New Mexico College of Population Health.

Education 
Collins earned a Bachelor of Science degree in chemistry from the University of Central Oklahoma, a Doctor of Medicine from the University of Oklahoma College of Medicine, a Master of Public Health from Harvard University, and a Master of Health Care Delivery Science from Dartmouth College.

Career 
Collins completed an internal medicine residency at the University of Oklahoma and two fellowships at Harvard Medical School. Collins worked on the faculty of the Baylor College of Medicine before becoming an associate professor at the University of Minnesota Medical School. From 2011 to 2019, Collins was a professor and department chair of the University of Kansas School of Medicine. In 2019, she became dean of the University of New Mexico College of Population Health. On November 11, 2020, Governor Michelle Lujan Grisham selected Collins as the Secretary of Health of New Mexico. She was confirmed by the New Mexico Senate on February 19, 2021.

References 

Living people
African-American women physicians
University of Central Oklahoma alumni
University of Oklahoma alumni
Harvard School of Public Health alumni
Dartmouth College alumni
Baylor College of Medicine faculty
University of Minnesota faculty
University of Kansas faculty
University of New Mexico faculty
Physicians from New Mexico
Year of birth missing (living people)
American women academics
State cabinet secretaries of New Mexico
Women in New Mexico politics
African-American people in New Mexico politics
African-American state cabinet secretaries
21st-century African-American people
21st-century African-American women